The Battle of Cologne was fought near the city of Köln (English: Cologne) (now part of Germany) in the year 716 CE. The battle is known chiefly as the first battle of Charles Martel's command and is the only defeat of his life.

History 
In 716, the king of the Franks, Chilperic II, and Ragenfrid, the mayor of the palace of Neustria, invaded Austrasia to impose their will on the competing factions there: those of Theudoald and Plectrude, grandson (and designated heir) and widow respectively of Martel's father Pepin of Heristal, and those of Martel himself, newly escaped from Plectrude's Cologne prison and acclaimed mayor of the palace of Austrasia. Simultaneously Radbod, King of Frisia invaded Austrasia and allied with the king and the Neustrians.

Outside of Cologne, held by Plectrude, an ill-prepared Charles Martel was defeated by Radbod, and forced to flee to the mountains of the Eifel. Cologne fell after a short siege to King Chilperic and the Neustrians. The Neustrians compelled Plectrude to acknowledge as king Chilperic, the son of Childeric II, having taken this Merovingian from the seclusion of the cloister, where he lived under the name of Daniel.

Once in the mountains of the Eifel, Charles began to rally his supporters, and in short order was ready to do battle. He fell on the army of Chilperic II, and at the Battle of Amblève near Amel as they returned triumphantly from Cologne, crushed their army. He remained undefeated thereafter for the next twenty-five years.

References

Literature
Oman, Charles. (1914). The Dark Ages 476–918. Rivingtons: London.

Cologne
Cologne
Cologne
History of Cologne
716
8th century in Francia